Dyschirius changlingensis is a species of ground beetle in the subfamily Scaritinae. It was described by Li in 1992 (Probably the Chinese entomologist Jing-Ke Li who published a book on the coleopterans of NE China in 1992.).

References

changlingensis
Beetles described in 1992